The 1926–27 Scottish Cup was the 49th season of Scotland's most prestigious football knockout competition. The Cup was won by Celtic who defeated East Fife in the final at Hampden Park.

Fourth round

Semi-finals

Final

Teams

See also
 1926–27 in Scottish football

References

Scottish Cup seasons
Scot
Cup